Pseudorhynchia is a genus of fungi in the family Trichosphaeriaceae. There are two species, P. mauritiana and 
P. polyrrhyncha.

References

External links

Sordariomycetes genera
Trichosphaeriales